The 2020 New Orleans Privateers baseball team represent the University of New Orleans (UNO) during the 2020 NCAA Division I baseball season. The Privateers play their home games at Maestri Field at Privateer Park as a member of the Southland Conference. They are led by head coach Blake Dean, in his 5th season at UNO.

Preseason

SLC media poll
The SLC media poll was released on February 6, 2020 with the Privateers predicted to finish 9th, the position they finished the previous season.

Preseason All-SLC teams

Along with Abilene Christian, the Privateers were one of only two teams that did not have any players selected by the conference to be part of their all-conference teams.

Reference:

Personnel

Coaching staff

Reference:

Schedule

All rankings from D1Baseball.

Reference:

References

New Orleans Privateers baseball seasons
New Orleans Privateers
New Orleans Privateers baseball